The 1962 Copa del Generalísimo Juvenil was the 12th staging of the tournament. The competition began on May 13, 1962, and ended on June 24, 1962, with the final.

First round

|}

Quarterfinals

|}

Semifinals

|}

Final

|}

Copa del Rey Juvenil de Fútbol
Juvenil